The Deadly Desert is the magical desert in Nonestica that completely surrounds the fictional Land of Oz, which cuts it off from the rest of the world.

Geology
On the map of Oz, first published in the endpapers of the eighth book, Tik-Tok of Oz (1914), the eastern quadrant of the desert is called the Deadly Desert, while the other three quadrants of desert are called the Shifting Sands, the Impassable Desert, and the Great Sandy Waste.

The desert was originally described as dangerous as any natural desert but no more. Indeed, in the second book, The Marvelous Land of Oz (1904), the witch Mombi tries to escape through it in the form of a griffin, and Glinda chases her over the sands. In the third book, Ozma of Oz (1907), it has become a magical desert with life-destroying sands and noxious fumes, a feature that remained constant through the rest of the series.

In the fifth book, The Road to Oz (1909), a sign is posted on the edge of the desert to warn travelers: 

ALL PERSONS ARE WARNED NOT TO VENTURE UPON THIS DESERTFor the Deadly Sands Will Turn Any Living Flesh to Dust in an Instant.Beyond This Barrier is theLAND OF OZBut no one can Reach that Beautiful Country because of these Destroying Sands.

The desert is used as a literary device to explain why Oz is essentially cut off from the rest of the world and the rest of the surrounding countries of Nonestica. However, it has been crossed several times by people from within Oz and from the outside world, with applied ingenuity, with magical assistance, or through unusual natural phenomena. In fact, no one in the Oz series is ever seen to die in the desert.

Notable crossings
 In the 1900 novel The Wonderful Wizard of Oz, Dorothy Gale is carried into Oz in her house by a cyclone and back over again by her Silver Shoes, which fall off during her flight and are lost in the desert. Also, the Wizard of Oz originally arrived in Oz by a circus balloon (which he implies functioned by a gas lighter than air, rather than hot air), and years later leaves Oz in a hot-air balloon of his own design.
 In The Marvelous Land of Oz, Tip and his companions fly over it using The Gump who was granted flight with its palm leaf parts.
 In Ozma of Oz, Princess Ozma crosses the desert with her whole court by use of an infinitely unrolling carpet.
 In The Road to Oz, Dorothy Gale, Shaggy Man, Polychrome and Button-Bright cross the desert into Oz by use of a sand ship.
 In The Emerald City of Oz, the Nome King and his allies the Whimsies, the Growleywogs, and the Phanfasms dug a tunnel underneath the desert.
 In The Scarecrow of Oz, Trot, Cap'n Bill, and Button-Bright flew over the desert carried by birds and led by Flipper the Ork.
 In The Magic of Oz, Kiki Aru transformed himself into a bird and flew over the Deadly Desert from the Land of Oz, exploring the various countries of Nonestica.
 In Kabumpo in Oz, a giant Ruggedo hopped right over the Deadly Desert and ran back to his mountain in the Land of Ev after Princess Ozma's palace got stuck in his hair spikes. In the same book, Kabumpo, Peg Amy, Pompadore, and Wag crossed over the Deadly Desert on a runaway country.
 In The Purple Prince of Oz, Polychrome allowed Prince Randy, Kabumpo, and Jinnicky the Red Jinn to ride her rainbow across the Deadly Desert.
 In Handy Mandy in Oz, a geyser beneath Mt. Mern in an unidentified area erupted underneath Handy Mandy sending her and the large boulder she was on over the Deadly Desert where she landed in Munchkin Country.
 In The Silver Princess in Oz, Kabumpo and King Randy were blown across the Deadly Desert by a powerful storm.

In other media
 In the 1985 film Return to Oz, Dorothy Gale crosses the edge of the Desert by stepping upon stones. Later, the pack of Wheelers working for Mombi fail to get across the Deadly Desert in pursuit of Dorothy and the Gump, who cross the desert to reach the Nome King's mountain. Six of the Wheelers fall into the desert and are subsequently turned into sand and killed. The seven remaining Wheelers later return with Princess Mombi and cross the desert through the tunnel that was dug underneath the desert to reach the Nome King's mountain.

 In Dorothy and the Wizard of Oz, the Deadly Desert is featured where it also contained a monster made of sand.

References

Fictional elements introduced in 1904
The Wizard of Oz locations
Fictional deserts